"Man Of My Word" is a song written by Gary Burr and Allen Shamblin, and recorded by American country music singer Collin Raye that reached the Top Ten on the Billboard Hot Country Singles & Tracks chart.  It was released in August 1994 as the third single from his CD Extremes.

Chart performance
The song debuted at number 68 on the Hot Country Singles & Tracks chart dated August 6, 1994. It charted for 20 weeks on that chart, and peaked at number 8 on the chart dated November 5, 1994.

Charts

Year-end charts

References

1994 singles
1994 songs
Collin Raye songs
Songs written by Gary Burr
Songs written by Allen Shamblin
Song recordings produced by Paul Worley
Epic Records singles